Younes Sekkouri (born 17 June 1981) is the Moroccan Minister of Economic Inclusion, Small Business, Employment and Skills. He was appointed as minister on 7 October 2021.

Education 
Sekkouri holds two Masters of Business Administration from the École des Ponts Business School and the Temple University. In addition, he holds a Doctor of Philosophy in Strategy from the ISCAE.

References

External links 

 Ministry of Economic Inclusion, Small Business, Employment and Skills

1981 births
21st-century Moroccan politicians
Living people
Moroccan politicians
Government ministers of Morocco

Temple University alumni